Shaneel Shavneel Lal (born 22 January 2000) is a Fijian-New Zealand LGBT rights activist, known for spearheading the movement to ban conversion therapy in New Zealand. Lal is a model, a columnist for New Zealand Herald, and a political commentator. Lal is a trustee of Adhikaar Aotearoa, a non-profit that provides education, support and advocacy for queer South Asians. Lal has served as an executive board member of RainbowYOUTH and Auckland Pride Festival.

Lal is the founder of the Conversion Therapy Action Group (CTAG), a group working to end conversion therapy in New Zealand, educate New Zealanders on the dangers of conversion therapy and advocate for support for survivors of conversion therapy.

Biography 
Lal is non-binary, vakasalewalewa and hijra, and uses they/them pronouns.

Lal was born in Nausori, Fiji to a mixed iTaukei and Girmitiya family on 22 January 2000. Lal comes from a Hindu family and was raised in a Hindu and Muslim community. After attending a Christian primary and high school in Fiji, Lal grew out of religion. Lal subscribes to indigenous spirituality.

In Fiji, Lal was put into conversion therapy in an attempt to change their sexuality and gender identity. The elders of the village prayed over Lal to free them of spirits that supposedly made Lal queer. Lal experienced conversion therapy as a challenge to their indigeneity and their relationship with their ancestors. Lal argues that prior to colonisation, vakasalewalewa were integral to native Fijian society. Lal claims that colonisation stripped Fijians of their rich queer identities and conditioned them with homophobia, transphobia and queerphobia. Lal claims that indigenous queerness is precolonial and distinct from colonial queerness and resists the translation of indigenous queer identities to English.

In 2014, Lal moved to New Zealand in the search of a safer home. Lal joined Otahuhu College and was named dux in 2018.

Lal's role in the campaign to ban conversion therapy 
In the summer of 2017, Lal was volunteering at the Middlemore Hospital when a church leader walked up to them and offered to pray their gay away. When Lal refused, the church leader wished hell upon them. Lal considers that a defining moment of their life, being the moment they decided that they were going to end conversion therapy in New Zealand. While living in Fiji, Lal was put into conversion therapy to rid them of their queerness.

Lal's speech at the 2019 Youth Parliament to ban conversion therapy received a standing ovation. Following this, Lal was targeted online with homophobic abuse. In an interview with Breakfast in 2020, Lal labelled conversion therapy "state sanctioned torture." Lal told interviewer Jenny-May Clarkson that numerous queer people pray to God to "heal them, or kill them." Following this interview, Massey University lecturer Steve Elers wrote an opinion piece for the Manawatu Guardian, and republished by The New Zealand Herald, dismissing the issue of conversion therapy and using transphobic language to discuss Lal's pronouns. David Farrier defended Lal in his blog Webworm, and the subsequent media attention led to Eller's opinion column being cancelled.

Lal founded the Conversion Therapy Action Group in 2019 to work towards ending conversion therapy in New Zealand. During the 2020 New Zealand general election, Lal and CTAG pressured the New Zealand Labour Party to commit to banning conversion therapy in New Zealand. Lal worked with the Green Party of Aotearoa New Zealand to deliver a petition of over more than 150,000 signatures to ban conversion therapy.

In July, the Minister of Justice, Kris Faafoi, introduced the Conversion Practices Prohibition Legislation Bill. Lal criticised the Bill, calling it an "inadequate bill that fails to ban the practice or compensate the victims." Lal argued that the Conversion Practices Prohibition Legislation Bill would not allow the police to prosecute offenders and allow conversion therapy to continue. The Justice Select Committee hearing submissions on the Conversion Practices Prohibition Legislation Bill received over a 100,000 submissions following Lal's online campaign, breaking the record for number of submissions.

Former National leader Judith Collins claimed the Bill would criminalise parents for being parents. Collins declared the Bill “anti-parents.” National MP Simon Bridges said the National Party would support the Bill if parents had an exemption under the Bill to stop their children from taking puberty blockers.
Lal claimed that the National party’s position was anti-children. Lal argued the law already tells parents how to be parent their children citing the anti-smacking law. Lal asserts that the Conversion Practice Prohibition Legislation Bill is an extension of anti-smacking laws designed to protect children from psychological harm. Lal disagreed with the National Party's assertion that the bill would criminalise parents for advising their children against taking puberty blockers; arguing instead that the bill banned parents from forcibly stopping their children from taking puberty blockers with the intention of suppressing their chose gender identity or expression.

Arise Church claimed that the Bill would criminalise parents, counsellors and pastors seeking to help children and young people with sexuality or gender. Lal argued that the Bill was clear that “the expression only of a religious principle or belief made to an individual that is not intended to change or suppress the individual’s sexual orientation, gender identity or gender expression will not be criminalised.” Lal said that as a former churchgoer, they were familiar with the church’s position. Lal argued that churches’ often show pretend concern and support for the queer community before launching into an attack on the existence of queer people. Lal stated that “there is a fine line between religious freedom and religious bigotry. Conversion practice is bigotry.”

Lal advocated for the justice committee to ban conversion therapy for people of all ages. Lal raised concern that the Bill would allow conversion therapy to continue for people aged 18 or above if the practice did not cause queer people grievous bodily harm. Lal demanded the Bill provide ACC coverage for mental harm suffered by survivors of conversion therapy. Lal disagreed with the bill giving the Attorney-General the sole discretion to prosecute cases of conversion therapy, claiming that it could be used by anti-LGBT governments to deny prosecution under the law.

In February, 2021, Minister of Justice announced a ban on conversion therapy would be enacted at the end of 2021 or in February, 2022, at the latest. Lal claimed that this "was an astounding commitment because at that point, Labour hadn’t done any foundational work that would have helped them achieve their goal."

The Conversion Practices Prohibition Legislation Bill passed at 2nd reading on 8 February 2022. 113 MPs voted in favour and 7 National Party MPs voted against banning conversion therapy. Lal claimed National MP Simon O'Connor's speech was as "an attack on trans people" and "absolute junk," and accused him of being transphobic.

Leading up to the 2nd reading of the Bill, Lal launched a petition asking the Labour Party to amend the Bill through Supplementary Order Papers at the Committee of whole House. Lal argued that the Labour Party ignored the voices of queer people and put forward an inadequate and ineffective Bill after the select committee process. The petition asked the Government to remove the 18-year age limit to include all ages, to remove the provision that the Attorney-General needed to give consent for prosecutions and to provide ACC coverage for the harm caused by conversion therapy. The Labour Party did not accept any recommendations despite the petition reaching 18k signatures in 2 days. Lal noted that the petition leaves a mark in history that the Labour Party had a majority and mandate to pass an effective ban but refused to do so.

The Conversion Practices Prohibition Legislation Bill passed at third reading on the 15 February 2022. Lal expressed that although it was disheartening to support a law that does not protect all queer people, the present ban on conversion therapy is a start to outlawing such practices. Lal said that New Zealand's ban on conversion therapy is a win for humanity, not just the queer community, asserting that queers rights are human rights.

Lal's message to the 8 National Members of Parliament was that they were banished from Pride. Lal said that the National MPs who voted against banning conversion therapy were not welcome at Pride. Lal told Stuff, “I am confident I speak for the community when I say I never want to see the people who voted against banning conversion therapy at Pride again. You are not welcome, do not come.” When questioned why the 8 National MPs who voted against banning conversion therapy were not invited to Pride, a space of inclusion, Lal told VICE World News that “Pride is a celebration of queer people, not a celebration of people who want to erase queer people,” she said. “Pride was born out of the need for a safe and accepting place for queer people – people who want queer people to be tortured have no place at pride.”

In an interview with The Edge, Lal shared that they received a death threat at their house after the passing of the Conversion Practices Prohibition Legislation Bill. A note stating "hang yourself," was left at Lal's door. Lal said that they have consistently received death threats in the movement to ban conversion therapy. Lal was sent threats following their speech at Youth Parliament in 2019, and was stalked in 2020 after a note stating "go to hell homo" was left at their door. Lal believes the same group left both notes. Lal burnt the note and called for celebration. Lal told VICE World News that the ban on conversion therapy is a gift to future generations of queer people.

On 17 February, Vogue magazine posted about Lal to their instagram, followed by an article in celebration of Lal's efforts to ban conversion therapy in New Zealand. Vogue wrote that "Lal’s call for New Zealand to reform the laws around conversion therapy have made a major impact."

The Conversion Practices Prohibition Legislation Bill received Royal Assent by Governor-General Cindy Kiro on 18 February and the came into effect on 19 February 2022.

Advocacy to lift the 'gay blood donation' ban 
A gay male can donate blood in New Zealand if they have not engaged in any anal or oral sex with another male in the last 3 months. Anyone who has taken PrEP or PEP in the last 3 months is ineligible to donate blood.

In an interview on Today FM, Lal told Tova O'Brien that the New Zealand Blood Service should allow gay men monogamous relationships, who have had sex only with each other in the last 3 months to donate blood. Lal says the New Zealand Blood Services has an obligation to keep the people safe but they also have an obligation to the queer community to uphold their rights and to not further stigmatise the queer community. 

All blood that is donated to the New Zealand Blood Services is tested for infectious diseases, including HIV, Hepatitis B and C. Testing accuracy is extremely good but it is not perfect. Lal says that “the concern is around newly acquired HIV. Newly acquired HIV is generally picked up by the test in 7 days, however, sometimes the person may need to live with HIV for up to 3 months for the test to pick it up.”

The New Zealand Blood Services states that 3 months is the maximum amount of time in which their test will pick up newly acquired HIV. Lal says that the testing period is why New Zealand Blood Services ask gay men to abstain from sex for 3 months before they donate blood. If they have acquired HIV from their last sexual partner, it can take up to 3 months for it to show up in the test.

Lal takes an issue with the blanket ban on gay blood donation. Lal argues that “a monogamous gay couple that has had sex only with each other for the last 3 months is banned from donating blood. If two gay men have only had sex with each other in the last three months, the only way for HIV to be introduced in their relationship is if one of the partners was already living with HIV before they started their monogamous relationship. This means that when they go to donate blood 3 months into their relationship, the New Zealand Blood Services test will pick up HIV if either person has been living with it. If they do not test positive for HIV 3 months into their monogamous relationship, it means that neither partner is living with HIV and they should both be able to donate blood.”

Researchers approximate that about 35 thousand people will be able to give blood if New Zealand Blood Services took this approach. Lal says the blanket ban on gay blood donation rules out people who can safely donate blood but are not allowed to because they are gay.

Investigation into Bethlehem College 
On June 11, NZ Herald published an article that stated that Bethlehem College in Tauranga requires all students and their families to demonstrate a commitment to the belief that marriage is only between a man and a woman. The school's Statement of Belief contains 13 points an enrolling student's parent or caregiver must read and acknowledge "that these statements summarise key beliefs of the Christian Education Trust, and underpin the School's Special Character". 

The last point is: "Marriage is an institution created by God in which one man and one woman enter into an exclusive relationship intended for life, and that marriage is the only form of partnership approved by God for sexual relations." The Ministry of Education said this point was added without its knowledge.

In response, Lal shared the article to their Instagram. Former and present students came forward and alleged the school of abuse. Lal said the students made allegations including victim blaming of people who alleged they were raped, racism and blackface incidents, and conversion therapy practices. Lal launched a petition calling for the Education Review Office to launch an independent investigation into Bethlehem College and for the Ministry of Education, the Minister of Education and the Associate Ministers of Education to support the investigation and use their regional offices to assist in the process. Lal said that when they “posted about the issue of homophobia at Bethlehem College, I did not realise the gravity of the abuse the former and present students have been experiencing at Bethlehem College.” The Ministry of Education replied that point 13 "must be removed" and it could consider "formal intervention".

Associate Education Minister Jan Tinetti, a former school teacher and principal, told Stuff she had asked education officials to urgently investigate schools’ practices and policies on inclusivity, to ensure “every single student” felt safe - regardless of gender identity or sexuality. ”This is my absolute top priority, to ensure all young people are safe in our schools,” Tinetti said. She said she asked the Ministry of Education along with the Education Review Office to investigate and come back with a range of options. “We expect one of the review methods to be a student voice survey which will help inform how the school can make sure all students at Bethlehem College are in an emotionally and physically safe environment,” said Jocelyn Mikaere at the Ministry of Education.

Lal shared a post on their Instagram story following messages they received from ex-students of Bethlehem College pointing to conversion therapy practices. After Lal shared the story on Saturday, personal trainer at Snap Fitness Tauranga Cheyenne Weston replied to Lal's story asking:  "Do you have a life?". "Asks a 'personal trainer,'" Lal replied, to which Weston responded, "asks a 'tranny".

Lal told Newshub the word "tranny" was a derogatory slur used "to humiliate me and insult me" and is often the last word that transgender people hear before being attacked or killed. Weston claimed she didn't know the meaning of "tranny" in a message to Lal. Many have left negative Google reviews for Snap Fitness pointing to Weston's transphobic message. Snap Fitness replied "a line has been crossed". "Her view does not represent the business but since she works in the facility, yes I agree she is representative of the business. We have people from the gay community in our facility and have always made them feel as welcome as anyone else. I am shocked to see this behaviour and we do apologise.” they said.

Advocacy and community work 
In 2022, Lal launched a petition calling the Labour Party to protect queer people, women and disabled people from hate speech. The petition gained over 10,000 signatures. Lal wrote in their NZ Herald column that "the Labour Party’s failure to prohibit anti-queer hate speech will embolden anti-queer groups, extremist religious groups, and right-wing groups to incite violence against queer people."  

Lal raised over $84,000 for RainbowYOUTH in 2022 after an arson attack on RainbowYouth. On the night of 15 June, Rainbow Youth's Tauranga Drop-in Centre was burnt down in an arson attack overnight. Rainbow Youth's building is 1 of 60 buildings in Tauranga's Historic Village. 

In 2020, Lal became a finalist for Mr Gay New Zealand, a competition run by Express Magazine. Lal won several challenges in the competition but did not win the title of Mr Gay NZ.

Following a Green Party event on 35 Years of Homosexual Law Reform, Lal criticised the lack of action by New Zealand's Pākehā queer community to support the decriminalisation of homosexuality in the Pacific Islands and addressed the racism in the New Zealand queer community. A petition called on Rainbow Youth to expel them from Rainbow Youth's board.

Lal is calling the Pacific Islands to decriminalise homosexuality. At the 2021 Auckland Pride March, Lal confronted anti-queer Christian protestors and told them that "God will never forgive you," leading to a national outrage at the protestors. Stuff NZ wrote that "the formidable Shaneel Lal is impossible to sum up in one sentence. At just 21 years old, they already have an impressive track record in politics, human rights and LGBTQI+ advocacy." In 2020, Ensemble magazine wrote that "at 20-years-old, Shaneel already has a prolific background in politics and Human Rights advocacy," adding "Shaneel is a force at the intersection of a range of marginalised groups, and like many of our young community leaders, is creating and inspiring change on the ground." In 2021, Lal was named an NZ VIVA magazine person of the year. VIVA wrote that "Shaneel Lal is a force, not simply in the corny sense of someone to be reckoned with but in the way that they carry an obvious agency: a deep care for many things with a rare tap to a seemingly endless source of resoluteness."

Pasifika communities have celebrated Lal for their advocacy for queer Pasifika voices and issues. The Coconet wrote that "Shaneel Lal is a multifaceted and intersectional activist. They have been vocal and influential in bringing to light various issues around racism, transphobia, indigenous land issues, systemic injustice and much more. Shaneel is a co-founder of the organisation "End Conversion Therapy NZ" and has been an avid voice around the need for a ban on Conversion Therapy." In an interview in 2020, Tagata Pasifika noted that "Fiji-born Shaneel Lal has been a standout Pasifika voice in this year's Pride celebrations as they've called out issues Pasifika face in the LGBTQI+ community."

Lal was featured in a VICE world documentary called The New Resistance. The documentary covered young activists around the world creating transformative change. Lal was captured in the documentary leading the movement to ban conversion therapy during the 2020 New Zealand general elections.

Self-proclaimed apostle and aspiring politician Brian Tamaki used his address to Destiny Church on 4 September 2022 to declare that queer people are perverts, unhealthy and abnormal. Lal says that Tamaki "being concerned about what consenting adults are doing in bed is perverted.

Awards 
Lal was awarded the Impact Award for Inclusion for their work to end conversion therapy in New Zealand. They were given a special award by the Pacific Cooperation Foundation for Inclusion, namely their work for equality for queer Pacific peoples. In 2020 review, 1 News named Lal a young leader that inspired New Zealand.

Lal featured on the cover of New Zealand Herald VIVA magazine for the 2021 People of Year edition. 2021 People of Year edition featured non-conformists who helped define 2021. Following Lal’s advocacy to end conversion therapy in 2021, VIVA described Lal as a “passionate changemaker who is the powerful voice of a generation.” VIVA celebrated “Shaneel’s integral role in articulating clearly the politics and issues they are passionate about on social media — particularly to a younger audience — is a compelling example of reaching audiences traditional media are still struggling to connect with.”

Vogue magazine featured Lal in their Youthquake, an edition celebrating Gen-Z creators who are pushing the conversation forward in ways both awe-inspiring and audacious. Vogue wrote that "in addition to using their platform to make serious policy changes, Lal is also using their status as a change-maker to make queer, BIPOC folks feel seen and heard in their community. Through their style choices, for one, they often champion a sense of queer celebration and cultural pride, and encourage others to do so."

Shaneel Lal joined the Forbes 30 Under 30 Asia Class of 2022 for their work to ban conversion therapy in New Zealand.

Other work 
Lal advised the Minister of Education, Chris Hipkins for 3 years as a member of the Minister's advisory group. Lal has sat on Amnesty International's Youth Task Force. Lal has served as a Global Youth Leader for Open Government Partnership. In 2019, Lal was selected by Jenny Salesa to represent Manukau East in the New Zealand Youth Parliament. Outside being an activist, Lal is a model signed with Unique Management.

Lal is a Young Justice Leader for New York University Center on International Cooperation. Young Justice Leaders are a group of young people brought together to influence the 2023 SDG Summit. The group is composed of change makers who bring expertise on people-centered justice systems.

References 

2000 births
Living people
People from Nausori
I-Taukei Fijian people
New Zealand LGBT rights activists
Fijian people of Indian descent
Fijian emigrants to New Zealand
People educated at Otahuhu College
Transgender non-binary people
New Zealand Youth MPs
Non-binary models
Fijian LGBT people
Non-binary activists
New Zealand non-binary people
Vakasalewalewa